Man About the House is a British sitcom starring Richard O'Sullivan, Paula Wilcox, Sally Thomsett, Yootha Joyce and Brian Murphy. First broadcast on ITV on 15 August 1973, the series ran for 39 episodes over six series until 7 April 1976.

Written by Johnnie Mortimer and Brian Cooke, the series follows the lives of three flatmates and the couple who sublet the church-commissioned property. The series, which was made by Thames Television and recorded at their Teddington Studios, was considered rather risqué when it was first broadcast as it focused on a young single man sharing a flat with two young single women.

Man About the House led to two spin-off series, George and Mildred and Robin's Nest.

Series overview

Episodes

Series 1 (1973)

Series 2 (1974)

Series 3 (1974)

Series 4 (1975)

Series 5 (1975)

Series 6 (1976)

References 

 British TV Comedy Guide for Man About the House

Man About the House
Episodes